Lower Moyamensing (sometimes shortened to LoMo) is a neighborhood in South Philadelphia just south of the East Passyunk Crossing neighborhood and north of the stadium area. It is bounded by Snyder Avenue to the north, Oregon Avenue to the south, South 7th Street to the east, and South Broad Street to the west. The neighborhood was once part of Moyamensing Township (later East Moyamensing) before becoming part of Philadelphia in 1854. Lower Moyamensing is known for its 19th century row homes, factory buildings, and variety of restaurants. South Philadelphia High School is located in Lower Moyamensing, at the corner of Broad and Jackson Streets.

Demographics

According to the 2020 Census data, the population of Lower Moyamensing is just over 16,000. 54.1% of the population identified as White, 25% as Asian, 4.9% as Black, 4.7% as mixed race, and 11.2% having Hispanic heritage. 73.8% of the population was born in the United States, of the foreign born population, 57.8% were born in Asia. The median household income is $52,100.

Parks
Marconi Plaza
Mifflin Square Park, established in the 1890s

Transportation

Lower Moyamensing is served by SEPTA's Broad Street Line subway line at Snyder station at the northern border and Oregon Station at the southern border, as well as several bus lines. Broad Street is the major north south roadway, Snyder Avenue and Oregon Avenue are the major east west roadways.

Hospitals
Methodist Hospital, part of the Jefferson University hospital network, is located on Broad and Wolf Streets.

Notable people
Angelo Bruno (1910-1980), mobster, boss of the Philadelphia Crime Family
James Darren (born 1936), actor
Fabian (born 1943), singer
Joey Giardello (1930-2008), boxer 
Bobby Rydell  (1942-2022), singer
Lisa Scottoline (born 1955), author
Scott Stewart (1802-1881), physician, founder of Methodist Hospital

References

Neighborhoods in Philadelphia
South Philadelphia